P. seemannii may refer to a few different species of plant.  The specific epithet seemannii refers to someone with the surname 'Seemann,' in many cases it's botanist Berthold Carl Seemann (1825–1871).

 Passiflora seemannii, a species of passionflower in the genus Passiflora
 Phyllanthus seemannii, a plant in the genus Phyllanthus native to Fiji
 Phytelephas seemannii, the Panama ivory palm 
 Ptychosperma seemannii, a synonym for Balaka seemannii, a palm endemic to Fiji